Moca is a town and municipality of Puerto Rico, located in the north-western region of the island, north of Añasco; southeast of Aguadilla; east of Aguada; and west of Isabela and San Sebastián. Moca is spread over 12 barrios and Moca Pueblo (the downtown area and the administrative center). It is part of the Aguadilla-Isabela-San Sebastián Metropolitan Statistical Area.

The name comes from the Moca tree (Andira inermis) which are very common in this region.

The Moca tree was officially adopted as the representative tree of the town on February 19, 1972. Moca is famous for its Mundillo lace. Mundillo is a Puerto Rican-style of handmade bobbin lace.  almost synonymous with the small town of Moca.

History

It was founded by Don José de Quiñones on June 22, 1772. Diverse versions exist on the date of its foundation. Manuel de Ubeda and Delgado, in his "Isla de Puerto Rico. "Estudio histórico, geográfico y estadístico", published in San Juan in 1878, says Moca was founded in 1774. On the other hand, Cayetano Coll y Toste, in the "Boletín histórico de Puerto Rico", maintains it was founded on June 22, 1772.

Puerto Rico was ceded by Spain in the aftermath of the Spanish–American War under the terms of the Treaty of Paris of 1898 and became an unincorporated territory of the United States.In 1899, the United States Department of War conducted a census of Puerto Rico finding that the population of Moca was 12,410.

On May 16, 2010, Moca was the epicenter of a strong 5.8 earthquake. The earthquake was felt in the entire island and also in the Dominican Republic and the Virgin Islands. Damage was reported in various towns.

On September 20, 2017 Hurricane Maria struck Puerto Rico. In Moca, landslides and the flooding of the Río Culebrinas caused major destruction to bridges, roads and homes. About 1300 homes were impacted by landslides and flooding, bridges collapsed, and residents were left without access to electrical power, telecommunication services and basic necessities. Close to a month and a half later, 25% of the 31,117 residents of Moca had electrical power and access to drinking water and 75% did not.

Geography

Moca is located on the northwest part of the island on the northern karst region of Puerto Rico.

Hydrography: The Río Culebrinas crosses its territory from east to west, and its tributaries include the gorges of Los Gatos, Lassalle, de las Damas, Vieja, Los Romanes, the Morones, Higuillo, Chiquita, Yagruma, Echeverria, Aguas Frias, Las Marias, de los Méndez, La Caraíma, Grande, y Dulce. Cerro Moca, Monte El Ojo, Monte Mariquita of the Jaicoa Mountain Range.

Barrios
Like all municipalities of Puerto Rico, Moca is subdivided into barrios. The municipal buildings, central square and large Catholic church are located in a barrio called Moca barrio-pueblo.

Aceitunas
Capá
 Centro
Cerro Gordo
Cruz
Cuchillas
Marías
Moca barrio-pueblo
Naranjo
Plata
Pueblo
Rocha
Voladoras

Sectors
Barrios (which are roughly comparable to minor civil divisions) and subbarrios, in turn, are further subdivided into smaller, local populated place areas/units called sectores (sectors in English). The types of sectores may vary, from normally sector to urbanización to reparto to barriada to residencial, among others.

Special Communities

 (Special Communities of Puerto Rico) are marginalized communities whose citizens are experiencing social exclusion. A map shows these communities occur in nearly every municipality of Puerto Rico. Of the 742 places that were on the list in 2014, the following barrios, communities, sectors, or neighborhoods were in Moca: Aceituna, Sector Isleta in Cruz barrio, Parcelas Acevedo and Parcelas Mamey in Moca barrio-pueblo, and Loperena.

Demographics

In 2020, the U.S. Census indicated that Moca had a total population of 37,012 inhabitants, a 7.7% decline from 2010.

Economy
 Agriculture: Fruits, dairy farming, cattle and bovine ranching.
 Business:
Industrial: Alarms, clothing, electronic machinery, footwear, plastic products.
Services: Lawyers, engineers, appraisers

Tourism

Landmarks and places of interest
Palacete Los Moreau
Enrique Laguerre House
Hacienda Enriqueta Museum
Mundillo Museum
Julia's Mundillo Shop
Our Lady of Monserrate Parish Church and Town Hall on the main plaza
Hacienda Labadie
Bowling Center and mini golf
Supreme Donuts shop

Culture

Festivals and events
Moca celebrates its patron saint festival in late August or early September. The  is a religious and cultural celebration that generally features parades, games, artisans, amusement rides, regional food, and live entertainment.

Sports
Moca has a Double-A (baseball) team called the  that play in the Superior Baseball League.
Juan Sanchez Acevedo Coliseum

Moca also had a volleyball team named , which played in LVS (Liga de Voleibol Superior) from 1998 to 2005. In addition,  were National Champions against  in the 2000 final.  swept the  4–0 in the finals.

Vampire myth

Although there have been reports of vampire-like attacks on farm animals from as early as the 1930s,  legend officially began on February 25, 1975, when newspapers reported that fifteen cows, three goats, two geese and a pig were found with puncture marks on their blood-drained bodies in Rocha, Moca. These events were also connected to UFO sightings and other supernatural reports by residents of Moca. Similar events were reported throughout 1975 in the towns of Corozal, Fajardo and even rural parts of San Juan. The legend resurfaced in the 1990s after similar reports came from Canóvanas.

Government

Like all municipalities in Puerto Rico, Moca is administered by a mayor. The current mayor is José Avilés Santiago, from the New Progressive Party (PNP). Avilés was elected at the 2000 general election.

The city belongs to the Puerto Rico Senatorial district IV, which is represented by two Senators. In 2012, María Teresa González and Gilberto Rodríguez were elected as District Senators.

Transportation 

There are 12 bridges in Moca.

Symbols
The  has an official flag and coat of arms.

Flag
Erick De Jesus designed Moca's flag. The rectangular flag consists of a magenta equilateral triangular field, the color of the Moca tree flower. In this field appear five-point stars, silver-plated, surrounding a greater gold star, also with five points.

Coat of arms
It has oblong form. Divided in a silver-plated field and blue sky united by a purple rhombus (diamond shape), the color of the Moca flower. The rhombus has religious symbolisms. The rhombus is surrounded, in its inferior part, by two branches of the Moca tree; in its superior part, an arc of eleven silver-plated five-point stars. Within the rhombus is a gold monogram (of the Virgin Mary) topped by a Christian crown of the same metal. A silver-lined crown in form of a three-tower castle crowns the shield. On the frontal portion of the crown, carved in gold, the word Moca. The stones of the castle are lined in blue. The doors and windows are purple.

Gallery

See also

List of Puerto Ricans
History of Puerto Rico
National Register of Historic Places listings in Moca, Puerto Rico
Did you know-Puerto Rico?

References

External links
 Moca and its barrios, United States Census Bureau
 Puerto Rico Government Directory - Moca

 
Municipalities of Puerto Rico
Populated places established in 1772
1772 establishments in the Spanish West Indies
1770s establishments in Puerto Rico